Hay Head Quarry is a 5.8 hectare (14.3 acre) geological site of Special Scientific Interest in the West Midlands. The site was notified in 1986 under the Wildlife and Countryside Act 1981 and is currently managed by the Country Trust.

See also
List of Sites of Special Scientific Interest in the West Midlands

References
 Hay Head Quarry English Nature. Retrieved on 2008-05-24

Hay Head Quarry
Sites of Special Scientific Interest in the West Midlands (county)
Geology of the West Midlands (county)
Quarries in England